Aberdeen F.C. competed in the Scottish Premier Division, Scottish Cup, Scottish League Cup and UEFA Cup Winners' Cup in season 1986–87.

Overview

Aberdeen lost their manager Alex Ferguson to Manchester United in November 1986. He was replaced by Ian Porterfield. On the field, the club finished in a disappointing fourth place in the Premier Division, and were knocked out of both domestic cup competitions by Celtic. In Europe, they were knocked out of the Cup Winners' Cup by Swiss club FC Sion at the first round stage.

New signings included midfielder Bobby Connor from Dundee and striker Davie Dodds from Swiss club Neuchâtel Xamax.

Results

Scottish Premier Division

Final standings

Scottish League Cup

Scottish Cup

European Cup Winners' Cup

Squad

Appearances & Goals

|}

References

 

Aberdeen F.C. seasons
Aberdeen